Traverse City, Michigan is a home rule, charter city under the Home Rule Cities Act, incorporated on May 18, 1895. The city is governed by six commissioners and a mayor, elected at-large. Together they comprise a seven-member legislative body. The commission appoints a city manager who serves as chief executive for city operations. Below is a list of mayors and village presidents in Traverse City, Michigan. The current mayor of Traverse City, Michigan is Richard Lewis.

Village presidents (1881–1895)

First city charter (1895–1940) 
Traverse City has been a city since 1895. The following are the first 24 mayors under the first city charter:

City commission elections (1941–2000) 
In 1940, a new city charter amendment was passed, allowing for mayors to be voted for directly by the city commission of Traverse City.

City voter elections (2000–present) 
In 2000, a new city charter amendment allowed for the citizens of Traverse City to vote directly for mayor. Mayors now could hold unlimited terms of two years.

References 

Traverse City, Michigan
Traverse City